Man on the Moon is the first Korean language studio album by the South Korean band N.Flying, released by FNC Entertainment on 7 June 2021.

Background 
On May 21, 2021, the group announced their comeback with their first studio album after six years of debut. The title song for the album was "Moonshot". The group held a showcase on the release of the album on June 7, 2021.

On September 27, 2021, the group announced that they would be releasing a repackage album entitled Turbulence. "Sober" was selected as the title track of the repackage album. An online comeback talk show was held in light of the group's comeback.

Track listing

References 

2021 albums
FNC Entertainment albums
Korean-language albums